La Salle Academy is a private Catholic La Sallian basic education institution run by the Philippine District of the Institute of the Brothers of the Christian Schools in Iligan City, Lanao del Norte, Philippines. It was founded in 1958. It is the first of the third generation of La Salle schools founded by the De La Salle Brothers in the country, namely: La Salle Green Hills in Mandaluyong (1959), Saint Joseph School-La Salle in Bacolod (1960), and De La Salle Lipa in Lipa City (1962).

History 
The La Salle presence in northern Mindanao came to be with the invitation of Msgr. Patrick Cronin of the Prelature of Ozamis to take over St. Columban's Academy in Iligan City.  This was the same school that used to be the Woodrow Wilson Junior College of the late forties and early fifties. When the first group of Brothers under Br. Crescentius Richard arrived in Iligan, the school was located in downtown Iligan, a stone's throw from the cathedral. Its faculty then included veteran educators Rosario Tsukimata (an affiliated Member of the Brothers), Pedro Generalao (founding Principal of Iligan City High School), Felicito Rugay (founding Director-Principal of Andres Soriano Memorial School, Lutopan, Cebu and Tranquilino Valderama Memorial School, Bubunawan, Bukidnon; and the Andres Soriano Jr. Learning Center, Aroroy, Masbate); and Carmelito Silva. A need for a bigger campus due to a growing student population necessitated the purchase of a three-hectare lot in Pala-o belonging to the estate of Pedro Nuñez.

The transfer to the new site in 1960 was accompanied by a change of name to La Salle Academy. Br. Honorius Alfred Shields, FSC, the second director and co-author of the book Biology for the Philippine High Schools, supervised the transfer to the nipa and bamboo structures and then, the construction of the permanent buildings in 1961. At that time La Salle was still an exclusive school for boys.

The next development in the school came in 1967 when La Salle opened its doors to Grade 5 pupils. It was arranged with the RVM Sisters that lower-grades boys and girls would study at St. Michael's College grade (elementary) school. For grade 5, the girls remained while the boys moved to La Salle.  Thus, began the nucleus of the La Salle Academy grade school.

A growing school-age population plus the demands of expansion necessitated the admission of girls. After a survey, girls were accepted into grades 5 and 6 as well as first year and second year in 1973. By this time, the basic structure of the school gym had been constructed under the supervision of the then principal, Bro. Jose V. Sy FSC.

The genesis of the La Salle Parents Foundation, Inc. (LASAPFI) came about this time. It was finally registered with the Securities and Exchange Commission by 1975 with the late EnManuel Hamoy as its first president and chairman of the board.

The school celebrated its Silver Jubilee in 1983 with Brother Mifrando S. Obach FSC, a former student and an alumnus of the school, class 1971, as its principal. The director of the Brothers community was Brother Robert Schieler FSC, who is now the Superior-General of the La Salle Brothers.  Plans were started to open the kindergarten level. The first batch was accepted in 1985 following a modified Individually Guided Education (IGE). The gym provided the open classrooms for the children. By 1986 the first batch of kindergarten students graduated. In 1987, the first phase of the Grade School building was constructed and dedicated to St. Brother Miguel. At this time, the new canteen was also constructed; then, followed by the construction of the second phase of the Grade School Building. In 1989 the library was built to accommodate both the grade school and high school. By this time, the school had breached the 1800 mark.

In 1990, construction of the Administration Building was completed, and the building was used to house the school Chapel, the Science Laboratories, the HS Faculty Room, the Accounting Office, the offices of the registrar, the academic coordinators and the president. In 1998, in celebration of the Centennial of Philippine Independence, the Centennial Amphitheater was constructed. By 2000 the Grade School Building (housing the Grade 6 classrooms, the GS Library & AVR and the Internet Lab) was finished. School year 2001–2002 saw the GS Ramp sponsored by the Parents Association (LASAPFI).

To validate the excellence of Lasallian education, the high school department received its first accreditation from the Philippine Accrediting Association of Schools, Colleges and Universities (PAASCU) in 1989 and re-accreditation followed in 1993 and 1998. The impetus towards development and growth had been sown.

More and more, La Salle carved a niche in the educational sector of society, finding and asserting its particular role and affirming its contribution to the development of the human resources of the city.

However, among the Brothers there was a worldwide movement towards the return of the charism of its founder, St. John Baptist De La Salle. The reach-out programs of the school became institutionalized with the creation of the Community Development Office in 1993. Then, the board of trustees approved the opening of the Night High School to begin operating in June 1994.

Through Br. Jimmy Dalumpines FSC as its president (1988–99), a property in Agad-agad was purchased for the school's Recollection program and its commitment to be "earth-keepers" by developing it into an Ecology Sanctuary. From this, saw the adoption of the nearby Purok Langilanon by forming the Langilanon Farmers Cooperative (LAFAMCO).

21st Century 
School year 1999–2000 saw the beginning of the TVET Department (Technical & Vocational Education Training). In 2000, the Brothers bought a property in Binuni, Bacolod, Lanao del Norte and asked the school's Community Development Office to help organize a cooperative similar to that of LAFAMCO. Eventually, TVET was closed in 2004 but the following year saw the construction of the retreat house and dormitory. The construction of the new four-storey school building started in 2006. The building was fully occupied in 2007–2008. In the same school year, a new basic education set-up for the day school was implemented having one principal and an academic vice principal.

In school year 2006–2007, the Office of Planned Giving was formed. The office administers the Student Financial Aid Program. This is to widen the opportunity for a free Lasallian education to qualified but economically disadvantaged youth of Mindanao particularly in Iligan City. The move gave birth to the Scholarship Endowment Fund Program and the Scholarship Endowment Fund Program Envelopes. It was during this year that a campaign for scholarships was started to reach the target of 20% of the total student population to be on full scholarship in 2011. The La Salle Academy Alumni Association (LSAAA) was also revived during the year to serve the alumni and the school. Some of its activities are the “Green Card” which is the alumni association official identification card and the co-sponsoring of the first-ever Grand Medical and Dental Mission held on campus, 

The school's website and the school's radio station, 99.8 Vibe FM was launched during the year. Through these services Lasallians can receive updates regarding the school, share ideas and perspectives and post photos making it more responsive to the demands of a technologically driven audience.

In school year 2007–2008, the Development and Alumni Relations Office was created.  Aside from sustaining the school's relationships with the alumni, the office is also in-charge of the planned giving and other development plans of the school. It spearheads the search for La Salle Academy's most distinguished alumnus/alumna. During said school year, the date for the Grand Alumni Homecoming was set to a fixed date which is every December 29 so alumni all around the globe will easily recall the date of the Alumni Homecoming.
It was at the start of the school year that the St. La Salle Building was inaugurated and was made ready for use for the high school populace. The first phase of the Jubilee Plaza was also done and towards the end of the school year the gym renovation started.

In response to the One Million Trees project of De La Salle Philippines, La Salle Academy planted trees in various places of Iligan City starting school year 2006–2007.

The PAASCU accreditors granted the high school a 5-year clean accreditation during the resurvey visit on November 26–27, 2007, in S.Y. 2008–2009, the PAASCU accrediting team granted the Grade School another 5-year clean accreditation during their survey visit on November 23–24, 2009. This is the second time that the grade school received such recognition, the first was in 2004.

In preparation for the centennial celebration of the Lasallian presence of the Brothers of the Christian Schools in the Philippines, La Salle Academy joined the simultaneous centennial kick-off celebration on June 16, 2010. La Salle Academy supported the centennial celebration activities such as the One La Salle Scholarship Fund, One Million Trees Project, Project Carbon Neutral, Centennial Fun Run and others.

With a mandate from the department of education and the De La Salle Philippines, the high school department implemented the Understanding by Design (UbD) framework in the first, second and third year levels. The move to use the new framework was deemed necessary to address the concern of improving the quality of education of the school and the country. In the coming school years, it is hoped that the UbD framework will be fully implemented in both the grade school and high school departments.

In SY 2012–2013, the school implemented the K to 12 Program as mandated by the government's Department of Education. In preparation for its implementation, the school conducted training for grades 1 and 7 teachers. The school renamed its high school levels into grade 7, 8, 9, and 10.

In the same school year, the High School Department submitted itself to external evaluation through Philippine Accrediting Association of Schools, Colleges and Universities (PAASCU) on February 11–12, 2013 and was granted a five-year re-accreditation status.

The Universal Kindergarten program of the Department of Education was adopted by the school in S.Y. 2013–2014.

With La Salle Academy's vision to be the center of excellence in providing quality education to the youth, it required the teachers to continue attending seminar-workshops on UbD to fully implement it in the classroom. Moreover, its implementation has already reached the grade 10 level. This thrust has been supported also by the new school president, Br. Felipe C. Belleza Jr. FSC. He has strengthened and suggested pedagogies that highlighted students’ welfare. Having managed La Salle Green Hills for 10 years, he has planned improvements in the school such as infrastructures in preparation for the implementation of K to 12 curriculum.

The Grade School Department had its Philippine Accrediting Association of Schools, Colleges and Universities (PAASCU) Resurvey Visit on January 19–20, 2015. In May 2015, PAASCU granted the Grade School Department a five-year re-accreditation status from SY 2015 – 2020.

In SY 2014 – 2015, the school started offering the Pre-Universal Kindergarten class. Also in the same school year, the last batch of Fourth Year students graduated from the Revised Basic Curriculum. The school has also continued its preparation for the Senior High School Program.
In SY 2015 – 2016, LSA received its Provisional Permit from the Department of Education allowing the school to start the Senior High School level with the following tracks: Academic Tracks – Accounting, Business and Management Strand (ABM), Humanities and Social Sciences Strand (HUMSS), Science, Technology, Engineering and Mathematics Strand (STEM) and Technical-Vocational Track with specialization in Electrical Installation and Maintenance and Computer Systems Servicing.  To prepare for its implementation, the school conducted a series of meetings with parents, students and partner industries. Teachers were also sent to trainings for syllabus writing.

In SY 2015 – 2016, LSA received its Provisional Permit from the Department of Education allowing the school to start the Senior High School level with the following tracks: Academic Tracks – Accounting, Business and Management Strand (ABM), Humanities and Social Sciences Strand (HUMSS), Science, Technology, Engineering and Mathematics Strand (STEM) and Technical-Vocational Track with specialization in Electrical Installation and Maintenance and Computer Systems Servicing.  To prepare for its implementation, the school conducted a series of meetings with parents, students and partner industries. Teachers were also sent to training for syllabus writing.

Holy Infancy Community
The Holy Infancy Community is the name of the De La Salle Brother's Community in La Salle Academy. As of school year 2021–2022, the community is composed of three members – Br. Fernando Sanding FSC, Br. Ivan Karlo Umali FSC, and Br. Henry FSC.

References

La Salle Academy Iligan Official Website
Old La Salle Academy Iligan Official Website

High schools in the Philippines
De La Salle Philippines
Iligan City
Schools in Iligan